Tyulyakovo (Tüläk) is a rural locality (a village) in Pervomaysky Selsoviet, Meleuzovsky District, Bashkortostan, Russia. The population was 241 as of 2010. There are 7 streets.

Geography 
Tyulyakovo is located 5 km east of Meleuz (the district's administrative centre) by road. Meleuz is the nearest rural locality.

References 

Rural localities in Meleuzovsky District